The ANAPROF Apertura 2007 season (officially "Torneo Apertura 2007") started on February 24, 2007. On May 27, 2007 the Apertura 2007 finalized with Tauro F.C. crowned seven time ANAPROF champion after beating San Francisco F.C. 2-0. Therefore, Tauro F.C. will participate in the Copa Interclubes UNCAF 2007.

Changes for 2007 Apertura 
The Grand Championship format was abandoned, therefore there will be two champions from now on: Apertura and Clausura.
Sporting '89 returned to their former name: Sporting San Miguelito.

Teams

Standings

Results table

[*]Plaza Amador-Atl. Chiriquí game was suspended after 67' minutes were played when incidents in the stadium, this lead for the remaining 23 minutes to be played closed doors, and no teams could change their starting line up. That game ended 1-0 in favor of Plaza Amador with goal from Alfredo Hernandez. But the Atl. Chiriquí denounced that Jean Estrebi (player in Plaza Amador) played the remaining 23 minutes without having starting the starting line up on the nights of the incident. The FEPAFUT ordered for the game to be replayed completely on May 9. Atl. Chiriquí won the game 2-0.

Final round

Semifinals 1st Leg (Semifinales - Juego de ida)

Semifinals 2nd Leg (Semifinales - Juego de vuelta)

San Francisco advances to final 3-0 on penalties

Final

Top goalscorers

Goalscorers by team

Local derby statistics
El Super Clasico Nacional - Tauro v Plaza Amador

Clasico del Pueblo - Plaza Amador v Chorillo

Clasico Interiorano - Atlético Chiriquí v Atlético Veragüense

ANAPROF seasons
1
Pan